The 2020 Meath Intermediate Football Championship is the 94th edition of the Meath GAA's premier club Gaelic football tournament for Intermediate graded teams in County Meath, Ireland. The tournament consists of 20 teams and starts with a group stage before progressing to a knock out stage. The winner will not represent Meath in the Leinster Intermediate Club Football Championship as the GAA made the decision to cancel the 2020 Provincial and All-Ireland Club Championships due to the impact of the COVID-19 pandemic on Gaelic games.

Nobber were the 2019 Meath Intermediate Football Champions after they defeated Trim in the final. As a result, they will compete in the 2020 Meath Senior Football Championship.

Three teams were relegated from the Senior Football Championship in 2019. Longwood returned to the I.F.C. after spending just one season in the Senior Football Championship. Rathkenny returned to the I.F.C. for the first time since 2006 while St. Patrick's returned to the I.F.C. for the first time since 2000.
Clann na nGael and Moylagh were promoted to the I.F.C. from the Meath Junior Football Championship.
Due to the change in championship structures, any second teams competing at the Intermediate grade were to be regraded to a new Premier Championship consisting only of reserve teams. To this effect, Donaghmore/Ashbourne 'B' and St. Peter's Dunboyne 'B' were regraded to Division 1 of the Premier Championship.
No team was relegated from the I.F.C. in 2019.

The 2020 Meath Intermediate Football Championship was due to commence in April 2020. However, due to health measures implemented in Ireland to combat the COVID-19 pandemic, all GAA activity was initially suspended until 29 March 2020 with the suspension being extended until 19 April 2020 and then 5 May 2020.
The GAA published a return to action protocol update on May 6th which stated that the suspension of GAA activity was "expected to remain in place until July 20". Meath GAA county board published their return to play document on June 11th outlining the 2020 adult championship formats and announcing the calendar for the completion of the 2020 football and hurling championships.
The draw for the group stages of the championship took place on 21 June 2020 with the games commencing on 31 July 2020. The 2020 Meath Intermediate Football Championship Final took place on 3 October 2020 prior to the commencement of the 2020 GAA Intercounty season on 17 October 2020. Ballinabrackey won their first ever Meath Intermediate Football Championship by beating Trim 0-16 to 1-12. Ballinabrackey will compete in the Meath Senior Football Championship in 2021 for the first time in their history.

Championship Structure
Due to the short window (11 weeks) to complete the 2020 Meath Intermediate Football Championship, some changes were made to the initial championship format.
The championship will consist of five groups with each containing four teams. However, only the group winners will progress to the knockout stages while the bottom team in each group will contest the relegation playoffs.

Team changes
The following teams have changed division since the 2019 championship season.

From I.F.C.
Promoted to 2020 S.F.C.
 Nobber - (Intermediate Champions)

Regraded to 2020 Premier Championship
 Donaghmore/Ashbourne 'B'
 St. Peter's Dunboyne 'B'

To I.F.C.
Relegated from 2019 S.F.C.
 Longwood
 St. Patrick's
 Rathkenny

Promoted from 2019 J.F.C.
 Clann na nGael - (Junior 'A' Champions)
 Moylagh - (Junior 'A' Runners-up)

Participating teams
The teams taking part in the 2020 Meath Intermediate Football Championship are:

Group stage 

There are five groups of four teams called Group A, B, C, D and E. The 1st placed teams in Groups A, B and C automatically qualify for the semi-finals. The 1st placed teams in Groups D and E qualify for the quarter-final with the winner progressing to the semi-finals.
The last placed teams in Groups A, B and C progress to the relegation Semi-Finals while the last placed teams in Groups D and E will playoff in a relegation Quarter-Final with the loser the playing in the relegation Semi-Finals. The losers of the relegation Semi-Finals playoff in the relegation final with the loser relegated to the 2021 Meath Junior Football Championship.

Tiebreakers:
If two or more teams were equal on points on completion of the group matches, the following tie-breaking criteria would be applied:

All Football Championships and Leagues shall be run on a combination of a league and knockout basis under Rule 6.21 T.O. Where teams finish equal with points for qualification or relegation process for concluding stages, the positioning shall be decided as follows;

 (i) Where three teams are involved - the outcome of the meetings of the three teams in their previous games in the competition. If three teams finish level on points for three places and one team has beaten the other two teams that team qualifies in first place and other places are determined by the specified order. If there are two positions and one team has beaten the other two teams that team qualifies and the second place is determined by the specified order. If there is one position and one team has beaten the other two team that team qualifies;
 (ii) Where two teams are involved - the outcome of the meeting of the two teams in the previous game in the competition;
 (iii) Scoring Difference;
 (iv) Highest total scores for;
 (v) A play-off.

Group A

Round 1
 Bective 2-10, 2-7 Drumbaragh, Cortown, 31/7/2020,

 Trim 3-8, 0-10 Rathkenny, Pairc Tailteann, 2/8/2020,

Round 2
 Rathkenny 2-17, 0-7 Bective, Kilmainham, 15/8/2020, 
 Trim 2-15, 1-8 Drumbaragh, Bohermeen, 16/8/2020, 

Round 3
 Drumbaragh 3-9, 2-12 Rathkenny, Kilmainham, 29/8/2020, 
 Trim 2-14, 0-10 Bective, Clonard, 29/8/2020,

Group B

Round 1
 Walterstown 0-16, 1-11 Moylagh, Carlanstown, 31/7/2020,

 St. Michael's 1-15, 2-11 St. Patrick's, Walterstown, 1/8/2020,

Round 2
 Walterstown 1-21, 2-11 St. Patrick's, Ratoath, 14/8/2020,

 St. Michael's 4-14, 1-9 Moylagh, Carnaross, 16/8/2020,

Round 3
 Moylagh 0-13, 0-8 St. Patrick's, Slane, 29/8/2020, 
 St. Michael's 2-12, 0-15 Walterstown, Pairc Tailteann, 29/8/2020,

Group C

Note: Game between Kilmainham and Castletown not played and would not affect final standings.
Kilmainham ranked ahead of Dunderry due to head-to-head result.

Round 1
 Kilmainham 2-11, 0-15 Dunderry, Bohermeen, 1/8/2020,

 Blackhall Gaels 3-13, 0-10 Castletown, Trim, 1/8/2020, 

Round 2
 Dunderry 2-16, 0-6 Castletown, Pairc Tailteann, 15/8/2020, 

 Kilmainham 2-11, 1-12 Blackhall Gaels, Dunsany, 16/8/2020, 

Round 3
 Kilmainham v Castletown - Not Played
 Dunderry 2-11, 1-13 Blackhall Gaels, Summerhill, 30/8/2020,

Group D

Round 1
 Syddan 1-11, 2-5 Oldcastle, Nobber, 1/8/2020,
 Duleek/Bellewstown 1-12, 2-9 Ballinabrackey, Trim, 1/8/2020,

Round 2
 Duleek/Bellewstown 1-14, 1-11 Oldcastle, Simonstown, 15/8/2020, 
 Ballinabrackey 3-16, 0-4 Syddan, Summerhill, 15/8/2020, 

Round 3
 Syddan 3-16, 5-10 Duleek/Bellewstown, Drumconrath, 29/8/2020, 
 Ballinabrackey 3-20, 0-4 Oldcastle, Pairc Tailteann, 29/8/2020.

Group E

Round 1
 Meath Hill 0-16, 1-11 Longwood, Pairc Tailteann, 1/8/2020,
 Clann na nGael 3-13, 1-10 Ballinlough, Pairc Tailteann, 4/8/2020,

Round 2
 Meath Hill 2-14, 0-14 Ballinlough, Nobber, 15/8/2020, 
 Clann na nGael 2-9, 2-8 Longwood, Clonard, 16/8/2020, 

Round 3
 Clann na nGael 3-8, 1-7 Meath Hill, Bective, 30/8/2020, 
 Longwood 1-16, 1-13 Ballinlough, Bohermeen, 30/8/2020,

Knock-Out Stage
The 1st placed teams in Groups A, B and C qualify for the semi-finals. The 1st place teams in Groups D and E qualify for the quarter-final with the winner progressing to the semi-finals

Quarter-final

Semi-finals

Final

Relegation play-off
The 4th placed teams in each group contest the relegation playoff. The 4th placed teams from groups D and E compete in the relegation Quarter-Final. The loser of the relegation Quarter-Final proceeds to the relegation Semi-Finals along with the 4th placed teams from groups A, B and C. The losers of the relegation Semi-Finals will then contest the relegation final. The loser of the relegation final will be relegated to the Junior Football Championship while all other teams retain their Intermediate status.

Relegation Quarter-Final

Relegation Semi-Finals

Relegation Final

References

External links

Meath IFC
Meath Intermediate Football Championship
Meath Championship
Meath Intermediate Football Championship